Elections to Reigate and Banstead Council in Surrey, England were held on 7 May 1998. One third of the council was up for election and the council stayed under no overall control.

After the election, the composition of the council was
Conservative 19
Labour 13
Liberal Democrat 11
Residents 5
Independent 1

Election result

References

1998 English local elections
1998
1990s in Surrey